Norman David Leet (born 13 March 1962) is an English former footballer who played in the Football League for Leicester City.

References

English footballers
English Football League players
Leicester City F.C. players
1962 births
Living people
Association football defenders